Joseph Michael Cook (born April 7, 1985) is a professional basketball coach, formerly Associate head coach for San-en NeoPhoenix in Japan and a former college basketball assistant coach for Cabrillo College. Joe Cook also served for the Sacramento Kings of the NBA as the Head Video Coordinator  and Akita Northern Happinets as Assistant Coach for three seasons. He has brought the NBA-style sets and styles of play to Akita.

Head coaching record

|-
|-
| style="text-align:left;"|Passlab Yamagata Wyverns
| style="text-align:left;"|2017-18
|46||19||27|||| style="text-align:center;"|Fired|||-||-||-||
| style="text-align:center;"|-
|-

References

1985 births
Living people
Akita Northern Happinets coaches
American expatriate basketball people in Japan
American men's basketball coaches
Brampton A's coaches
California State University, Sacramento alumni
Cannabis law
Passlab Yamagata Wyverns coaches
San-en NeoPhoenix coaches